Elections to Ards Borough Council were held on 7 June 2001 on the same day as the other Northern Irish local government elections. The election used four district electoral areas to elect a total of 23 councillors.

Election results

Note: "Votes" are the first preference votes.

Districts summary

|- class="unsortable" align="centre"
!rowspan=2 align="left"|Ward
! % 
!Cllrs
! % 
!Cllrs
! %
!Cllrs
! %
!Cllrs
! %
!Cllrs
!rowspan=2|TotalCllrs
|- class="unsortable" align="center"
!colspan=2 bgcolor="" | DUP
!colspan=2 bgcolor="" | UUP
!colspan=2 bgcolor="" | Alliance
!colspan=2 bgcolor="" | SDLP
!colspan=2 bgcolor="white"| Others
|-
|align="left"|Ards East
|N/A
|2
|N/A
|3
|N/A
|1
|N/A
|0
|N/A
|0
|6
|-
|align="left"|Ards West
|36.9
|3
|bgcolor="40BFF5"|42.2
|bgcolor="40BFF5"|2
|18.5
|1
|0.0
|0
|2.4
|0
|6
|-
|align="left"|Newtownards
|bgcolor="#D46A4C"|37.5
|bgcolor="#D46A4C"|2
|33.3
|2
|12.2
|1
|0.0
|0
|17.0
|0
|6
|-
|align="left"|Peninsula
|bgcolor="#D46A4C"|36.8
|bgcolor="#D46A4C"|2
|17.9
|1
|19.2
|1
|12.5
|1
|13.6
|0
|5
|- class="unsortable" class="sortbottom" style="background:#C9C9C9"
|align="left"| Total
|37.0
|9
|31.7
|8
|16.7
|4
|3.9
|1
|10.7
|0
|23
|-
|}

Districts results

Ards East

1997: 4 x UUP, 1 x UUP, 1 x Alliance
2001: 3 x DUP, 2 x DUP, 1 x Alliance
1997-2001 Change: DUP gain from UUP

As only six candidates had been nominated for six seats, there was no vote in Ards East and all six candidates were deemed elected.

Ards West

1997: 3 x UUP, 2 x Alliance, 1 x DUP
2001: 3 x DUP, 2 x UUP, 1 x Alliance
1997-2001 Change: DUP (two seats) gain from UUP and Alliance

Newtownards

1997: 2 x UUP, 2 x Independent Unionist, 1 x DUP, 1 x Alliance
2001: 2 x DUP, 2 x UUP, 1 x Alliance, 1 x Independent Unionist
1997-2001 Change: DUP gain from Independent Unionist, Independent Unionist becomes Independent

Peninsula

1997: 2 x DUP, 1 x UUP, 1 x Alliance, 1 x SDLP
2001: 2 x DUP, 1 x UUP, 1 x Alliance, 1 x SDLP
1997-2001 Change: No change

References

Ards Borough Council elections
Ards